Jacob Adam McLaughlin (born October 7, 1982) is an American soldier and actor. Following his military service, including action in the Iraq War, he came to attention for his role as Specialist Gordon Bonner in the 2007 film In the Valley of Elahbased on actual events involving American soldiers who served in the Iraq War.

McLaughlin starred as Tate in the short lived NBC series Believe (2014). Since then, he has been in the main cast for season 2 of Crash (2009), the series Quantico (2015–18) and, as of 2023, the series Will Trent.

Early life
McLaughlin is the son of John P. McLaughlin, of Irish descent, and wife Rebecca Kay De Victoria, of Cheyenne and Irish descent.

He attended Paradise Elementary School, Notre Dame Catholic School, and Chico High School in Chico, California. He moved to Southern California and obtained a GED from North Hollywood High School, in Los Angeles, California.

McLaughlin joined the United States Army as a Dismount Infantry Squad Automatic Weapon Gunner in 2002. He was part of the 3rd Infantry Division. During the Iraq War, his unit was one of the first to enter Baghdad.

Acting career
After leaving the military, McLaughlin worked on a crab boat in Oregon and as a security guard at Universal Studios. He was living in Chico, California, doing concrete work and had only $200 in his checking account when he heard about the casting session for Paul Haggis's In the Valley of Elah. Being a former Dismount Infantry S.A.W. Gunner in Iraq in real life, he thought he would read for the role after hearing that Haggis was auditioning actual vets for several parts.

After the success of his first movie, McLaughlin made minor roles in movies such as The Day the Earth Stood Still and Cloverfield. He appeared in episodes of The Unit and CSI: Crime Scene Investigation. He got his first major role on TV in 2009, when he was cast in the television remake of the Oscar-winning film Crash. In the following years he made many appearances on television. In 2011, he was cast in Warrior which was followed by a supporting role in Safe House.

In February 2013, McLaughlin was cast as the male lead in Believe, a television pilot by Alfonso Cuarón which was picked to series in May 2013. The show premiered on NBC in March, 2014.

In March 2015, McLaughlin was cast in the role of Ryan Booth on the television pilot, Quantico, which was picked to series in May. The show premiered on the ABC network in September 2015.

Personal life
McLaughlin married Stephanie in 2004. They have four children, daughters Rowan, Reagan, and Freya, and son Logan.

Filmography

References

External links
 
 
 
 

1982 births
Living people
People from Paradise, California
United States Army soldiers
United States Army personnel of the Iraq War
21st-century American male actors
American male film actors
American male television actors
American people of Irish descent
Male actors from California
North Hollywood High School alumni